Howlin Rain is an American rock band based in Oakland, California, formed in 2004 by guitarist/singer Ethan Miller. Their most recent album The Dharma Wheel was released in 2021. Their sound has been described as "classically soulful" and "Unapologetically influenced by the strong but easygoing grooves of West Coast 1970s rock".

History
Ethan Miller formed Howlin Rain in 2004 when he was still a member of Comets on Fire, as an outlet for his songwriting interests and the influence of life in the Lost Coast area of Northern California. The first incarnation of the band also included bassist Ian Gradek and drummer John Moloney (who later joined Sunburned Hand of the Man). The final Comets on Fire album was released in 2006, after which Miller dedicated himself to Howlin Rain full-time. The group has since featured a revolving line-up with Miller as the only constant member.

The self-titled album Howlin Rain was released in 2006, establishing a "psychedelic country/garage rock" sound, after which the band toured as the opening act for Queens of the Stone Age. In 2007, the band signed with Rick Rubin to American Recordings. Their second album Magnificent Fiend, featuring an expanded line-up, was released in 2008. This album was noted for featuring jam band elements, and was described as a "combination of psychedelia, blues, funk and classic 1970s arena rock." The EPs Wild Life and The Good Life followed.

Howlin Rain performed at All Tomorrow's Parties in England in 2010. Their third full-length album The Russian Wilds was released in 2012, featuring further experiments in blues rock and 1970s album-oriented rock. This was the band's final album with American Recordings, and Miller reformed the line-up once again. Miller then conceived an interconnected trilogy of albums, and the first installment Mansion Songs was released in 2015. 

Miller formed his own label, Silver Current Records, which issued The Alligator Bride in 2018. That album introduced hard rock and R&B elements to the group's sound. The third album in the planned trilogy, The Dharma Wheel, was released in 2021.

Members

Current members 
Ethan Miller – vocals, guitar
Jeff McElroy - bass
Dan Cervantes - guitar
Justin Smith - drums

Past members 

 Meg Baird - guitar, drums
 Cyrus Comiskey - bass
 Richard Danielson - drums
 Eli Eckert - guitar, bass
 Ian Gradek - bass
 John Gnorski - guitar
 Garett Goddard - drums
 Neil Harmonson - drums, guitar
 Mike Jackson - guitar
 Isaiah Mitchell - guitar
 John Moloney - drums
 Joel Robinow - keyboards, horns, guitar
 Charlie Saufley - guitar, bass

Discography

Albums
 Howlin Rain (2006)
 Magnificent Fiend (2008)
 Wild Life (EP, 2008) 
 The Good Life (EP, 2010) 
 The Russian Wilds (2012)
 Live Rain (live, 2014)
 Mansion Songs (2015)
 The Alligator Bride (2018)
 The Dharma Wheel (2021)

References

External links
 Official website

Indie rock musical groups from California
Musical groups from Oakland, California
Birdman Records artists